Fritz Mauthner (22 November 1849 – 29 June 1923) was an Austrian philosopher and author of novels, satires, reviews and journalistic works. He was an exponent of philosophical scepticism derived from a critique of human knowledge and of philosophy of language.

Mauthner was born on 22 November 1849 into an assimilated, well-to-do Jewish family from Horzitz in Bohemia (now Hořice in the Czech Republic).

He became editor of the Berliner Tageblatt in 1895, but is remembered mainly for his Beiträge zu einer Kritik der Sprache (Contributions to a Critique of Language), published in three parts in 1901 and 1902. Ludwig Wittgenstein took several of his ideas from Mauthner, and acknowledges him in his Tractatus Logico-Philosophicus (1922).

Mauthner died in Meersburg am Bodensee on 29 June 1923.

Life

Early life
Fritz Mauthner was born in 1849, as the fourth of six children of Emmanuel and Amalie Mauthner. The Mauthners were a wealthy Jewish family who did not practise their faith. Mauthner's grandfather was a follower of Frankism. Mauthner describes his father in the autobiography as having "literally grown up without knowledge of any catechism" and his educated mother, who took care of the children's education, as "anti-religious". Mauthner's family spoke German, unlike most of the Bohemian population. His parents were proud of the fact that they spoke German. Mauthner learned German through his family, Czech through his nursemaid and a little Hebrew through a private teacher. Philosopher Gershon Weiler suggests that "it is unlikely that he ever passed beyond the point of mastering the alphabet" in Hebrew. As a German-speaking Jew in the Bohemian region of the Austrian Empire, Mauthner belonged to a double minority and struggled to find a sense of belonging. This experience is cited in later years as formative for his intellectual development. In the autobiography, Mauthner writes "I do not understand at all if a Jew born in a Slavic region of Austria is not pushed into linguistic research."

In 1855, the five-year-old Mauthner moved to Prague with his family to be educated. Mauthner received private lessons, attended a private Jewish school (Klippschule) and later two secondary schools. In his autobiography he writes disparagingly about the low standard of the schools. He considered himself highly gifted and was resentful of the school system. His autobiography is largely a critique of the school system of the time, which was limited to corporal punishment and learning by rote.

Mauthner wanted to become a writer; his father wanted him to become a merchant. They agreed that he would study jurisprudence at Charles University in Prague. Mauthner studied jurisprudence from 1869 to 1873. At the university, Mauthner attended lectures in philosophy, music, physics, art history, medicine and theology. He read Arthur Schopenhauer and Ernst Mach, under whom he also attended lectures.

Mauthner passed the first state examination in law and worked as a theatre critic, writer and poet alongside his studies. With the death of his father in 1874, Mauthner broke off his studies. He published unsuccessful volumes of poetry, and worked as a journalist and playwright. His play Anna premiered at the Estates Theatre in 1874, but was discontinued after only a few performances. The comedy Die leidige Geldfrage (The tiresome question of money) was shown in Prague and Berlin in 1876.

Berlin and Freiburg im Breisgau
In 1876, at the age of 27, Mauthner moved to Berlin, known on the theatre scene as a critic and author. He chose Berlin and not Vienna because he was enthusiastic about Bismarck and because he did not want to be patronised by his family in Austria. In Berlin, Mauthner worked as a journalist for several newspapers and wrote literary and theatre criticism for the Berliner Tageblatt, a leading liberal daily newspaper. He published books and volumes of poetry and became a well-known cultural figure. Mauthner, together with Paul Lindau, was considered Germany's most qualified theatre critic.

In 1878 he married Jenny Ehrenberg, a pianist, and his only daughter Grete was born. In the following years, Mauthner worked as an editor, publisher, critic and writer. His novels were historical, socio-critical, German-national, satirical, and columnist. Some of his books, such as the parodies, were very successful, and were translated and published in several print runs during Mauthner's lifetime. Their literary quality is judged ambivalently: The commercially successful works consist mainly of light novels, which can be judged as being shallow. Some of Mauthner's novels, however, contain reflections that would later be considered philosophically.

1893 Mauthner began to work on the Beiträge zu einer Kritik der Sprache (Contributions to a Critique of Language). During the work, his wife Jenny died, and he suffered from an eye disease, which threatened to make him blind. He collaborated with anarchist philosopher and pacifist Gustav Landauer to finish the text. The Contributions to a Critique of Language appeared from 1901 to 1903 in the three volumes Zur Sprache und zur Psychologie (On Language and Psychology), Zur Sprachwissenschaft (On Linguistics) and Zur Logik und Grammatik (On Logic and Grammar). The work was largely rejected among academic circles, which disappointed Mauthner deeply. He suffered from depression and developed a strong dislike of the city life in Berlin and of his journalistic work, which he had always continued to do as a bread-and-butter occupation. He called journalism a "trade with words" (Worthandel) and expressed his dissatisfaction several times in letters.  

In 1905, at the age of 56, Mauthner left Berlin and lived in Freiburg, where he met and married the physician and writer Hedwig (Harriet) Straub in 1907. His book on Spinoza was published in 1906, and as from 1907 he attended university lectures in mathematics and natural sciences, while devoting himself mainly to philosophy and writing. Mauthner regarded Hugo von Hofmannsthal's The Lord Chandos Letter (1906) as a work influenced by his own critique of language.

Meersburg
In 1909, Mauthner moved with his wife Hedwig to Meersburg on Lake Constance, in a well-known house called Glaserhäusle. There he wrote the monograph Die Sprache (Language) for the series Die Gesellschaft, edited by Martin Buber. Mauthner worked on the Wörterbuch der Philosophie (Dictionary of Philosophy) and Der Atheismus und seine Geschichte im Abendlande (Atheism and its History in the Occident). The Dictionary appeared in 1910 and 1911. In three volumes with about 2,000 pages in total, Mauthner exercised his critique of language, set out in the Contributions, exemplified on the central concepts of Western philosophy. His eye disease worsened during the process; he dictated the text to his wife Hedwig to write down and read out aloud. Mauthner developed a godless mysticism as a culmination of the critique of language. It is assumed that the importance of mysticism emerged from his collaboration with Hedwig Straub. In 1912, his last novel Der letzte Tod des Gautama Buddha (The Last Death of Gautama Buddha) was published.

During World War I, Mauthner wrote inflammatory and nationalistic newspaper articles. He reflected on the connection between philosophy and war; although he did not embrace the war, he placed the importance of Germany's military success above any philosophy. His political commitment disturbed his friends, especially Gustav Landauer.

During the last years of his life, he revised the Dictionary in parallel with his work on the history of atheism. From 1920 to 1923, Der Atheismus und seine Geschichte im Abendlande appeared in four volumes.

Mauthner died at age 74 on 29 June 1923. Hedwig Mauthner continued to live in the Glaserhäusle after her husband's death. During the National Socialist regime, as the widow of a Jew, she was banned from publishing books in 1933 and her pension payments were stopped. She survived through the help of friends and the Meersburg town priest Wilhelm Restle, and died impoverished in 1945. Fritz and Hedwig Mauthner are buried together at Meersburg cemetery; their gravestone reads Vom Menschsein erlöst (Redeemed from being human).

Philosophical work
Mauthner's philosophical work is concerned with the philosophy of language and atheism. Three books, each in several volumes, can be regarded as his main theoretical contributions: The Beiträge zu einer Kritik der Sprache (three volumes 1901–1902, third revised edition 1923), Wörterbuch der Philosophie (two volumes 1910, third revised edition in three volumes 1923–1924) and Der Athesimus und seine Geschichte im Abendlande (four volumes 1920–1923). Besides these works, Mauthner published shorter works on the philosophy of Aristotle, Spinoza and Schopenhauer, as well as on various topics related to his philosophy of language.

Mauthner's writing style is unorthodox: he draws on a variety of sources, combines his biography with theoretical considerations, he writes redundantly and, above all, comprehensively a lot (each of his three main works comprise more than 2,000 pages). With the exception of the essay Skepticism and the Jews, which was published posthumously in English translation in The Menorah Journal in 1924, none of his theoretical writings have been translated into English.

Critique of Language
Mauthner advocates an empirical, sceptical nominalism, which he develops into a comprehensive and epistemological theory. He consistently pursues this approach to the conclusion that all philosophical problems are problems of language. Thus, Mauthner can be understood as a precursor of logical empiricism. Philosopher Elisabeth Leinfellner calls him a thinker in the Austrian tradition of philosophy, but also writes that he regards himself as a thinker in the succession of Hume. Weiler calls Mauthner paradigmatic for the English tradition of empiricism. Mauthner's philosophy, like logical empiricism, is characterised by an anti-metaphysical attitude and a methodical approach through linguistic analysis. At the same time, his premises are based in a different tradition and his goal is not a reform of language through its analysis, but – as a paradoxical project – the destruction of language as a tool to gain knowledge. For Mauthner, a logical analysis of language is also condemned to fail, as he regards logic as just another form of language. Mauthner's philosophy stands for the tragic admission that it is impossible to gain knowledge through the means of language. 

Mauthner describes empiricism as the school of thought that gave him the idea of the critique of language. For him, everything that is regarded knowledge can be traced back to sensory experience. The central feature for this assumption is his concept of the Zufallssinne (contingent senses): if all knowledge is traced back to sensory experience, then the sense organs are the condition for the possibility of knowledge. Animals and humans, however, have different sensory apparatuses and therefore perceive the world differently. The way how humans see the world is a moment of evolutionary development. No organic condition of world perception can perceive the world as it actually is. Mauthner writes: "The words of language are ultimately unfit for penetrating into the essence of reality, because words are only memory-indices for the sensations of our senses and because these senses are contingent senses, which truly experience nothing more of reality than a spider does of the palace in whose oriel arbour it has spun its web. Thus mankind must quietly despair of ever knowing reality."  

This scepticism concerns language only as an instrument of knowledge. The poetic and communicative function of language is recognised by Mauthner. Language is useful for the daily life, but not for knowledge.

Belief in extra-linguistic reference is called word superstition (Wortaberglaube) or word fetish (Wortfetisch). In this context, Mauthner introduces the term Scheinbegriff (pseudo-concept), which later became one of the central concepts in the tradition of logical empiricism. The meaning attributed to the words of language is nothing other than the memory of its use. He argues that language is language use, similar as Wittgenstein does later. Mauthner intends to show that an abstract language consisting of grammatical rules and vocabulary is an artificial abstraction that the negates psychological reality. Language is rooted in sensory experience. The deception that words refer to an extra-linguistic reality particularly affects philosophy, which he criticises as being metaphysically charged by historic traditions: "I live by the belief and the conviction that the sceptical nominalism, with which I have shown the inadequacy of human language in general, particularly affects philosophical concepts, and among them most strongly the most general concepts."  

Mauthner states his philosophical programme of a critique of language in the introduction to the Dictionary as follows: "Philosophy is epistemology, epistemology is the critique of language; the critique of language, however, is the work on the liberating thought that people can never get beyond the figurative representation of the world with the words of their languages and with the words of their philosophies."

Legacy
While Mauthner's literary work can be considered forgotten, his philosophy of language resonated in the literature of the 20th century. Mauthner's influences can be found in the work of Jorge Luis Borges, Samuel Beckett and James Joyce. Today, Mauthner's philosophy is mainly received in relation to with Wittgenstein.

Throughout his life, Mauthner himself was unhappy about the lack of response to his work. The lack of response, however, refers primarily to academic philosophy, which did not react to Mauthner. The Contributions to a Critique of Language sold well and were well reviewed in newspapers.

Mathematician Felix Hausdorff, for example, wrote a positive review and communicated his enthusiasm in letters to Mauthner. Kühn lists forty to fifty reviews from 1901 that react to the publication Mauthner's Contributions. Gustav Landauer undertakes an early examination of Mauthner's philosophy in 1902 and writes the book Skepsis und Mystik that depicts Mauthner as a mystic. Hermann Häfker and Theodor Lessing were critical of Mauthner and accused him of confusion in his philosophical foundations. The first monograph on Mauthner was published in 1926 by Theodor Kappstein, which is regarded as an uncritical praise by Kühn. With the rise of Nazism, the engagement with the Jewish thinker ends abruptly and Mauthner becomes forgotten.

It is, however, undisputed that Mauthner had been well known for his literary, journalistic and philosophical work. Two famous people in the history of philosophy bear witness to this: Karl Popper mentions in his autobiography some of the philosophy books in his father's library, and states Mauthner's Contributions as being there among the works of Descartes, Spinoza, Kant, Schopenhauer and others. The second mention, to which Mauthner credits the philosophical interest, comes from Ludwig Wittgenstein. Wittgenstein mentions Mauthner in the Tractatus, and although it is a delimiting remark, this mention can be understood as an expression of appreciation, since Wittgenstein mentions very few philosophers by name.

Mauthner's concept of word superstition is discussed in the influential book The Meaning of Meaning by C. K. Ogden and I. A. Richards. The most influential reception in the English-speaking world comes from philosopher and writer Gershon Weiler, who published the first comprehensive English-language monograph on Mauthner, along with numerous essays. An intellectual biography is available in French. A modern German edition of Mauthner's works, including the Dictionary of Philosophy and the Contributions to a Critique of Language, was edited by German philosopher und literary scholar Ludger Lütkehaus.

Mauthner's estate is preserved as the Fritz Mauthner Collection at the Center for Jewish History, Leo Baeck Institute New York.

Works

Philosophy
Beiträge zu einer Kritik der Sprache, three volumes, Stuttgart: J.G. Cotta, 1901–1903.
 Aristoteles, 1904
 Spinoza, 1906
 Die Sprache, 1907
 Wörterbuch der Philosophie, two volumes 1910–11, three volumes 1923–24
 Schopenhauer, 1911
 Der letzte Tod des Gautama Buddha, 1913
 Der Atheismus und seine Geschichte im Abendlande, four volumes 1920–23
 Muttersprache und Vaterland, 1920

Fiction
 Anna, 1874
 Lyrik
 Die große Revolution, 1872
 Nach berühmten Mustern, satirical, 1878, 1889
 Einsame Fahrten, 1879
 Vom armen Franischko, story, 1879
 Die Sonntage der Baronin, 1881
 Der neue Ahasver, 1882
 Dilettantenspiegel, satirical, 1883
 Gräfin Salamanca, 1884
 Xanthippe, 1884
 Berlin W. (trilogy of novels): Quartett, 1886; Die Fanfare, 1888; Der Villenhof, 1890
 Der letzte Deutsche von Blatna, novel, 1887
 Der Pegasus, 1889
 Zehn Geschichten, 1891
 Glück im Spiel, 1891
 Hypatia, 1892
 Lügenohr, 1892 (under the title: Aus dem Märchenbuch der Wahrheit, 1899)
 Kraft, novel 1894
 Die Geisterseher, novel 1894
 Die bunte Reihe, 1896
 Der steinerne Riese, novella, 1896
 Die böhmische Handschrift, novella 1897
 Der wilde Jockey, 1897
 Der letzte Tod des Gautama Buddha, novel 1913
 Der goldene Fiedelbogen, 1917

Essays and theoretical works
 Kleiner Krieg, 1879
 Credo, 1886
 Tote Symbole, 1892
 Zum Streit um die Bühne, 1893
 Totengespräche, 1906
 Gespräche im Himmel und andere Ketzereien, 1914

Translations
 Henriette Marechal, by Edmond de Goncourt, 1895

Editorial
 Wochenschrift für Kunst und Literatur, 1889-1890
 Magazin für die Literatur des In- und Auslandes, 1991
 Bibliothek der Philosophen, from 1911

Collected works
 Ausgewählte Schriften, 6 books, 1919

Miscellaneous
 Erinnerungen, autobiography 1918
 Selbstbiographie 1922, in: Philosophie der Gegenwart in Selbstdarstellungen, Bd. 3.

Notes and references

Notes

References

Further reading
Arens, Katherine. Empire in decline: Fritz Mauthner's critique of Wilhelminian Germany.  New York: P. Lang, 2001.
Ben-Zvi, Linda. Samuel Beckett, Fritz Mauthner and the Limits of Language. PMLA. Vol. 95(2): 183-200. 1980.
Bredeck, Elizabeth. Metaphors of Knowledge: Language and Thought in Mauthner's Critique. Wayne State University Press, 1992.
Dapía, Silvia. Die Rezeption der Sprachkritik Fritz Mauthners im Werk von Jorge Luis Borges. Cologne, Weimar, Vienna: Böhlau, 1993
Knowlson, James & Pilling, John.  Frescoes of the skull.  London: John Calder, 1979.
Kühn, Joachim.  Gescheiterte Sprachkritik: Fritz Mauthners Leben und Werk.  Walter de Gruyter, 1975.
Ludwig, Otto & Heydrich, Moritz.  Shakespeare-Studien.  Halle: H. Gesenius, 1901.
Skerl, Jennie. Fritz Mauthner's "Critique of Language" in Samuel Beckett's "Watt".  Contemporary Literature.  Vol. 15(4): 474-487. University of Wisconsin Press, 1974.
Sluga, Hans.  Wittgenstein and Pyrrhonism.  In Walter Sinnott-Armstrong (Ed.)  Pyrrhonian Skepticism.  Oxford University Press, 2006
Vierhufe, Almut.  Parody and Language Critique. Studies on Fritz Mauthner's Nach berühmten Mustern.  Niemeyer, 1999.
Weiler, Gershon. Mauthner's Critique of Language. Cambridge University Press, 1970.

External links

 Fritz Mauthner Collection at the Leo Baeck Institute
 Guide to the Fritz Mauthner Correspondence Collection 1765-1868
 Book review of Fritz Mauthner's Die Sprache
 
 

1849 births
1923 deaths
20th-century Czech philosophers
20th-century Austrian philosophers
Austrian male writers
Austro-Hungarian Jews
Austrian-Hungarian writers
Czech writers in German
German people of Czech-Jewish descent
Jewish philosophers
People from Hořice
People from the Kingdom of Bohemia
Philosophers of language